Zamacois is a surname of French Basque origins.

People with this surname 

Niceto de Zamacois (1820–1885), Spanish writer and historian.
Elisa Zamacois (1838-1915), Spanish singer and actress.
Eduardo Zamacois y Zabala (1841–1871), Spanish painter.
Ricardo Zamacois (1847-1888), Spanish actor and singer.
Miguel Zamacoïs (1866–1955), French writer.
Eduardo Zamacois (1873–1971), Spanish writer.
Joaquín Zamacois (1894–1976), Spanish composer.

Basque-language surnames